The Ven. John Maxwell, D.D. was  Archdeacon of Clogher from 1762 until 1783.

The grandson of Bishop Robert Maxwell, he was born in Faulkland and educated at Trinity College, Dublin. After curacies in Dublin and Clontibret he held incumbencies at Donagh, Aughnamullan, Rossory and Drummully.

Notes

Archdeacons of Clogher
18th-century Irish Anglican priests
People from County Monaghan
Alumni of Trinity College Dublin
Year of birth missing
Year of death missing